Robert Letham is Professor of Systematic and Historical Theology at the Union School of Theology (formerly called Wales Evangelical School of Theology). He is also Adjunct Professor of Systematic Theology at Westminster Theological Seminary.

Letham's academic education started with a B.A. (Hons.) in Politics awarded by University of Exeter in 1969. He then gained a P.G.C.E. in 1971 from the University of Nottingham. He moved to Westminster Theological Seminary earning a  M.A.R. and Th.M. in 1975 and 1976 respectively. He was awarded a Ph.D. from the University of Aberdeen in 1980.

He began pastoral ministry at Emmanuel Presbyterian Church (OPC), Whippany, New Jersey from 1981 to 1986. He also served as senior minister at Emmanuel Orthodox Presbyterian Church in Wilmington, Delaware for 17 years.

He has taught theology at the London School of Theology, Westminster Theological Seminary, Reformed Theological Seminary (Washington DC/Baltimore).  He is also a visiting fellow, Faculty of Religion and Theology, Texts and Traditions, at the Vrije Universiteit, Amsterdam. Since 2007, he is Senior Tutor in Systematic and Historical Theology at the Union School of Theology.

Works

The Holy Trinity: In Scripture, history, theology and worship. Revised and Expanded edition . Phillipsburg, New Jersey, 2019.
The Holy Spirit, P&R Publishing, 2023

References

External links
Faculty profile for Robert Letham
Union School of Theology faculty profile

1947 births
20th-century Calvinist and Reformed theologians
21st-century Calvinist and Reformed theologians
Alumni of the University of Aberdeen
Alumni of the University of Exeter
Alumni of the University of Nottingham
English Calvinist and Reformed theologians
Living people
Systematic theologians
Westminster Theological Seminary alumni
 
 
Westminster Theological Seminary faculty